Boncheleh is a village in Quri Qaleh Rural District, Shahu District, Ravansar County, Kermanshah Province, Iran. At the 2006 census, its population was 570, in 115 families.

References 

Populated places in Ravansar County